No Me Sé Rajar (Eng.: I Do Not Know How to Give Up) is a studio album released by the Mexican banda ensemble Banda el Recodo. This album became their first number-one album in the Billboard Top Latin Albums chart and also received a nomination for a Grammy Award for Best Mexican/Mexican-American Album.

Track listing
This information from Billboard.com
No Me Sé Rajar (José Carmen Frayle) — 2:54
Las Llaves de Mi Alma/Que Te Vaya Bonito (Vicente Fernández/José Alfredo Jiménez) — 3:46
Las Vías del Amor (Alfonso Lizarraga/Noe Hernández/Joel Lizarraga) — 3:32
La Muerte de un Gallero (Tomás Sosa Méndez) — 2:32
Acá Entre Nos (Martin Urieta) — 3:10
De Qué Manera Te Olvido/Lástima Que Seas Ajena (Federico Méndez/Jorge Massias) — 4:44
Si No Te Quisiera (Carlos José Reyes Hernández) — 3:04
Los Mandados (Jorge Lerma) — 2:26
Mujeres Divinas (Urieta) — 2:50
Yo Quiero Ser (Rosendo Montiel) — 3:47
Hermoso Cariño (Fernando Maldonado) — 2:12
Nos Estorbó la Ropa (Teodoro Bello) — 2:23
La Ley del Monte (José Ángel Espinoza Ferrusquilla) — 2:35
Las Vías del Amor (Club Mix) — 4:09
No Me Sé Rajar (Club Mix) — 3:28

Personnel
This information from Allmusic.
Alfonso Lizárraga — Arranger, producer, graphic design, art direction, concept
La Banda el Recodo — Arranger
Ezequiel Paez — Arranger
Carlos Santana — Arranger
Carlos Luna — Recording, mixing
Velarde Daly Lizárraga — Production assistant
Noe Sepulveda — Production assistant
Adolfo Pérez Butrón — Photography
Eduardo Arias — Make-Up

Chart performance

Sales and certifications

References

2002 albums
Banda el Recodo albums
Fonovisa Records albums